Blenda Wilson (born January 28, 1941) is a retired American university administrator and educational executive who was the first African-American woman to become president of a large (over 25,000 students) American university.  She was president of California State University, Northridge (CSUN) during the 1994 Northridge earthquake, one of the worst natural disasters in U.S. history.  Wilson oversaw the rebuilding of CSUN over several years, costing nearly $400 million and repairing or rebuilding over 100 buildings on the campus.

Early life and education
Blenda Jacqueline Wilson was born in Perth Amboy, New Jersey. Her parents were Horace Lawrence Wilson and Margaret Brogsdale Wilson.  She received her bachelor's degree from Cedar Crest College in Allentown, Pennsylvania in 1962, her master's degree from Seton Hall University in South Orange, New Jersey in 1965, and her Ph.D. from Boston College in 1979.

Career
Wilson held a variety of administrative and executive positions at universities and non-profit organizations, including the Middlesex County, New Jersey Economic Opportunities Corporation, Rutgers University, Harvard University, Independent Sector, and the Colorado Commission on Higher Education). In 1988, she was appointed the first female chancellor at the University of Michigan-Dearborn.

California State Northridge
In 1992, Wilson was appointed the third president of California State University, Northridge (CSUN). She was the first woman and first African-American to hold the position. Wilson was the first African-American woman to become president of a large (over 25,000 students) American university. 

She was president of CSUN during the 1994 Northridge earthquake, one of the worst natural disasters in U.S. history.  Wilson oversaw the $400 million rebuilding of the campus over several years, where 107 buildings were damaged or destroyed, making it at the time the most expensive natural disaster to impact a university in the United States.  

While Wilson received local and national praise for her work in earthquake recovery at CSUN, she also was criticized for scandals that marred her presidency.  During a time of severe budget cutbacks, she was criticized for planning faculty layoffs.  She responded by telling the CSUN Faculty Senate that "This is not an employment agency, this is a university."

Nellie Mae Education Foundation
In 1999, Wilson was appointed president and chief executive officer of the Nellie Mae Education Foundation in Quincy, Massachusetts, where she served until 2006.

Community service
Wilson has served as a trustee for the Getty Foundation, the James Irvine Foundation, Boston College, Cambridge College, the College Board, and deputy chairman of the Federal Reserve Bank of Boston.

Personal life
Wilson has been married to Louis Fair, Jr. since 1985.

References

External links
California State University Northridge

1941 births
African-American academics
African-American educators
American academic administrators
Living people
People from Perth Amboy, New Jersey
Presidents of California State University, Northridge
Boston College alumni
Seton Hall University alumni
Cedar Crest College alumni
21st-century African-American people
20th-century African-American people